Sax, Strings & Soul is an album by saxophonist Red Holloway recorded in Europe in 1964 and released on the Prestige label.

Reception

Allmusic awarded the album 3 stars.

Track listing 
 "When Irish Eyes Are Smiling" (Chauncey Olcott, George Graff, Jr., Ernest Ball) - 4:07   
 "Bossa in Blue" - 3:05   
 "Where Have All the Flowers Gone?" (Pete Seeger, Joe Hickerson) - 3:14   
 "Nights With Lora" - 3:44   
 "If I Had a Hammer" (Seeger, Lee Hays) - 3:40   
 "I Wish You Love" (Léo Chauliac, Charles Trenet) - 4:28   
 "Star of David" (Mason) - 4:15   
 "The Girls in the Park" (Wallin) - 3:15

Personnel 
Red Holloway - tenor saxophone
Unnamed Orchestra arranged and conducted by Benny Golson

References 

Red Holloway albums
1964 albums
Prestige Records albums
Albums arranged by Benny Golson